SamuTale is a massively multiplayer sandbox survival game, developed and published by Maple Media. The official early access release date was September 14, 2016. The game is currently only available for Microsoft Windows and can be played by purchasing a "Founder's Pack" on the official SamuTale website.

Gameplay
Players can explore the game's vast open world set in the time of the samurai featuring building, farming, crafting, horse riding, clan wars and much more. SamuTale grants players freedom to do as they please, whether that be to build up their own village, harvest crops, craft, or join a clan and engage in pitched battles with other clans.

In April 2020, the game launched a major new update featuring a completely revamped game world with six different biomes to explore. The update also added the long-awaited raiding mechanics to the game which gives players the ability to attack and plunder each other's clan villages.

References

External links
 

2016 video games
Massively multiplayer online games
Open-world video games
Windows games
Windows-only games
Japan in non-Japanese culture
Multiplayer video games
Massively multiplayer online role-playing games
Video games about samurai
Video games developed in the United States
Video games set in Japan